The 1909 American Cup was the annual open cup held by the American Football Association.

American Cup Bracket
Home teams listed on top of bracket

(*): replay after tied match

Final

Replay

Paterson True Blues: GK Garside, DF Murray, McClellan, MF MacInstri, Stewart, Chambers, FW Spindler, Fletcher, McWinnie, Gilmour, Donechie.
Clark A.A.: GK Hunt, DF Tomar, T.Fisher, MF Lone, Porter, Foster, FW C.Fisher, Maitland, Martin, Young, Neilson. 

Amer
American Cup